Anggika Sri Bölsterli or better known as Anggika Bölsterli (born June 21, 1995) is an Indonesian actress. Bölsterli made her acting debut with an appearance in the drama series Terbang Bersamamu and first received recognition for her recurring role in the television series Putri Duyung.

Early life 
Anggika was born and raised in the Sunter Agung area, North Jakarta. Her father, Pieter Bölsterli is from Switzerland, while his mother, Titin is from Madiun, East Java. She has a younger brother named Lukas Bölsterli. After graduating from school, Anggika chose to pursue a career in acting rather than accepting an offer to study in Switzerland from her parents. She began to participate in the selection of actors for advertisements and soap operas.

Career 
Her debut as an actress was in 2013, playing the role of Allisa in the soap opera . Anggika's name became widely known through her role as Astrid in the soap opera .

When she started her career as an actress, she was not fluent in speaking Indonesian. This is because she often uses English and Javanese in her daily life.

Filmography

Film

Television

Web series

Awards and nominations

References

External links 
 
 
 

1995 births
Living people
21st-century Indonesian actresses
Indonesian film actresses
Indonesian television actresses
Indonesian female models
Actresses from Jakarta
Indo people
Javanese people
Indonesian people of Swiss descent